General elections were held in Honduras on 28 October 1928. Vicente Mejía Colindres of the Liberal Party was re-elected as president, becoming the first incumbent to be re-elected in peaceful and contested elections.

Results

President

Congress

References

Bibliography
Argueta, Mario. Tiburcio Carías: anatomía de una época, 1923-1948. Tegucigalpa: Editorial Guaymuras. 1989. 
Bardales B., Rafael. Historia del Partido Nacional de Honduras. Tegucigalpa: Servicopiax Editores. 1980.
Bulmer-Thomas, Victor.  “Honduras since 1930.”  Bethell, Leslie, ed.  1991.  Central America since independence.  New York: Cambridge University Press.
Dodd, Thomas JTiburcio Carías: portrait of a Honduran political leader. Baton Rouge: Louisiana State University Press. . 2005. 
Elections in the Americas A Data Handbook Volume 1. North America, Central America, and the Caribbean. Edited by Dieter Nohlen. 2005.
Euraque, Darío A. Reinterpreting the banana republic: region and state in Honduras, 1870-1972. Chapel Hill: The University of North Carolina Press. 1996.
Haggerty, Richard and Richard Millet. “Historical setting.” Merrill, Tim L., ed. 1995. Honduras: a country study. Washington, D.C.: Federal Research Division, Library of Congress.
Krehm, William. Democracia y tiranias en el Caribe. Buenos Aires: Editorial Parnaso. (First edition in 1947). 1957. 
Morris, James A. Honduras: caudillo politics and military rulers. Boulder: Westview Press. 1984. 
Morris, James A. “Honduras: the burden of survival in Central America.” Central America: crisis and adaptation. 1984. Albuquerque: University of New Mexico Press.
Political handbook of the world 1929. New York, 1930.
Stokes, William S. Honduras: an area study in government. Madison: University of Wisconsin Press. 1950. 

Elections in Honduras
Honduras
1928 in Honduras
Presidential elections in Honduras
October 1928 events
Election and referendum articles with incomplete results